Martin Kohlroser (8 January 1905 – 14 November 1967) was a mid-ranking commander in the Waffen SS during World War II who was awarded the German Cross in Gold.

Commands
1st SS Grenadier Regiment Landstorm Nederland (SS-Standartenführer)
SS Volunteer Grenadier Brigade Landstorm Nederland 
34th SS Volunteer Grenadier Division Landstorm Nederland (SS-Oberführer)

References

1905 births
1967 deaths
SS-Oberführer
Recipients of the Gold German Cross
Waffen-SS personnel